HMS Bronington was a  of the Royal Navy, launched on 19 March 1953. This mahogany-hulled minesweeper was one of the last of the "wooden walls" (wooden-hulled naval vessels).

History
Bronington was laid down on 30 May 1951 by Cook, Welton & Gemmell at Beverley, Yorkshire. Built on the River Hull she was launched on 19 March 1953 and Bronington was commissioned as HMS Humber on 4 June 1954. Humber spent four years in the Royal Naval Volunteer Reserve where it served as part of the 101st Minesweeping Squadron.

Reverting to its original name in 1958, the vessel was converted into a minehunter at Rosyth Dockyard between 1963 and 1965, and was commissioned to, initially the 5th Minesweeper Squadron, and the 1st Mine Countermeasures Squadron on 5 January 1967.

King Charles III (then the Prince of Wales) commanded the vessel between 9 February and 15 December 1976. Subsequently, under the command of his successor, Lieutenant A. B. Gough R. N., it ran aground in the River Avon while departing from Bristol.

During the late 80s, the vessel saw service in the Mediterranean as part of 2nd Mine Counter Measures Squadron, with NATO as part of the Standing Naval Force Channel and also as a fishery protection vessel.

After being decommissioned from service, the ship was purchased in January 1989 by the Bronington Trust, a registered charity whose patron is the King. For some time, the ship was berthed in the Manchester Ship Canal at Trafford Park, Greater Manchester, England and was open to visitors for ten years. On 11 July 2002, she became part of the collection of the Warship Preservation Trust and was moored at Birkenhead, Merseyside.

On 17 March 2016, Bronington sank at her moorings.

Preservation
December 2021 saw the formation of the 'HMS Bronington Preservation Trust', an organisation dedicated to raising the vessel and preserving it.

As of 2022, the ship is still partially submerged. The preservation trust commissioned a dive survey in June 2022 to establish the state of the vessel. The survey revealed the vessel to be in good condition, with only two minor holes in the hull. Subject to fund raising, the trust hopes to move the vessel to a dry dock at Cammell Laird where it will be restored, either for sailing or for use as a static museum exhibit.

References

External links 
 HMS Bronington Preservation Trust
 About HMS Bronington
 HMS Bronington at National Historic Ships Register

Ton-class minesweepers of the Royal Navy
1953 ships
Cold War minesweepers of the United Kingdom
Museum ships in the United Kingdom
Ships and vessels of the National Historic Fleet
Maritime incidents in 2016
Charles III